Vasil Paparizov (born 22 February 1934) is a Bulgarian boxer. He competed in the men's middleweight event at the 1960 Summer Olympics. At the 1960 Summer Olympics, he lost to Ion Monea of Romania.

References

External links
 

1934 births
Living people
Bulgarian male boxers
Olympic boxers of Bulgaria
Boxers at the 1960 Summer Olympics
Sportspeople from Plovdiv
Middleweight boxers